"I Just Can't Get Her Out of My Mind" is a song written by Larry Gatlin, and recorded by American country music artist Johnny Rodriguez.  It was released in January 1975 as the second single from the album Song About Ladies and Love.  The song was Rodriguez's fourth number one on the country chart.  The single stayed at number one for one week and spend a total of nine weeks on the country charts.

Chart performance

References

1975 singles
Johnny Rodriguez songs
Song recordings produced by Jerry Kennedy
Mercury Records singles
Songs written by Larry Gatlin
1975 songs